Gujarat has 252 talukas. The table below lists all the talukas in the state of Gujarat, India, by district.

The urban status is listed for the headquarters town of the taluka, rural talukas are much larger. Urban status follows the census standard.

 M.Corp. = Municipal Corporation
 C.M.C. = City Municipal Council
 T.M.C. = Town Municipal Council
 T.P.    = Town Panchayat
 G.P.     =    Gram Panchayat

References

Gujarat
Gram Panchayat Election District Wise List : View District Results